The 10th annual Venice International Film Festival  was held from 11 August to 1 September 1949. The Venice Film Festival came back permanently to the Palazzo del Cinema on the Lido di Venezia.
The award for the Best film is first called "The Lion of St. Marcus" (instead of Great International Prize of Venice) will maintain this name until 1954, when it became known as Golden Lion permanently.

Jury 
 Mario Gromo 
 Ermanno Contini
 Emilio Lavagnino
 Giannino Marescalchi
 Aldo Palazzeschi
 Piero Regnoli
 Gian Luigi Rondi
 Gino Visentini
 Cesare Zavattini

In Competition

Awards
 Golden Lion of Saint Mark 
 Manon (Henri-Georges Clouzot)
 Best Italian Film
 Cielo sulla palude (Augusto Genina)
 Volpi Cup
 Best Actor - Joseph Cotten (Portrait of Jennie)
 Best Actress - Olivia de Havilland (The Snake Pit)
 Best Director - Augusto Genina (Cielo sulla palude)
 Best Original Screenplay - Jacques Tati (Jour de fête)
 Best Cinematography - Gabriel Figueroa (La malquerida)
 Best Production Design - William Kellner (Kind Hearts and Coronets)
 International Award
 Berliner Ballade (Robert A. Stemmle)
 The Quiet One (Sidney Meyers)
 The Snake Pit (Anatole Litvak)
 OICI Award - Cielo sulla palude (Augusto Genina)

References

External links
 
Venice Film Festival 1949 Awards on IMDb

Venice International Film Festival 
Venice International Film Festival 
Venice Film Festival
Film
Venice International Film Festival
Venice International Film Festival